Boissy-la-Rivière is a commune in the Essonne department in Île-de-France in northern France.

Geography
The village lies on the right bank of the Juine, which forms most of the commune's western border.

Inhabitants of Boissy-la-Rivière are known as Buccussiens.

See also
Communes of the Essonne department

References

External links

Mayors of Essonne Association 

Communes of Essonne